Sheykh Teymur (also Romanized as Sheykh Teymūr and Sheykh Teymūrī) is a village in Badranlu Rural District, in the Central District of Bojnord County, North Khorasan Province, Iran. At the 2006 census, its population was 216, in 68 families.

References 

Populated places in Bojnord County